This is a timeline of the Tibetan Empire from 6th to 9th century.

7th century

8th century

9th century

See also
Timeline of the Tang dynasty

References

Bibliography

 
 .

 (alk. paper)

  (paperback).
 

 
 .

 

 

 
 
 

 
 
  
 

 
Timelines of historically non-Chinese states in China